The 67th running of the Tour of Flanders cycling classic was held on Sunday, 3 April 1983. Dutch rider Jan Raas claimed his second win in the monument race following a 20 km solo attack. His teammate Ludo Peeters won the sprint for second place at one-and-a-half minute. 38 of 188 riders finished.

Route
The race started in Sint Niklaas and finished in Meerbeke (Ninove) – covering 272 km. There were 12 categorized climbs:

Results

References

External links
 Video of the 1983 Tour of Flanders  on Sporza (in Dutch)

Tour of Flanders
1983 in road cycling
1983 in Belgian sport
1983 Super Prestige Pernod